Joseph Harris (19 March 1893 – 29 October 1933) was a Scottish professional footballer who played as a half-back in Scottish football for Shettleston, Strathclyde and Partick Thistle (where he won the Scottish Cup in 1921), and in the English Football League for Middlesbrough, Newcastle United (where he won the League title in 1926–27) and York City.

Harris was capped twice by the Scotland national team in 1921.

He was not related to Neil Harris, also from east Glasgow who played for Partick and Newcastle in the same era.

References

1893 births
1933 deaths
Footballers from Glasgow
People from Bridgeton, Glasgow
Scottish footballers
Scotland international footballers
Association football midfielders
Glasgow United F.C. players
Strathclyde F.C. players
Partick Thistle F.C. players
Middlesbrough F.C. players
Newcastle United F.C. players
York City F.C. players
Scottish Football League players
Scottish Junior Football Association players
English Football League players